California's 68th State Assembly district is one of 80 California State Assembly districts. It is currently represented by Republican Steven Choi of Irvine.

District profile 
The district encompasses inland central Orange County, running along the Santa Ana Mountains. The district is primarily suburban and affluent, with several planned communities.

Orange County – 15.4%
 Anaheim – 21.6%
 Irvine – 34.0%
 Lake Forest
 Orange – 92.6%
 Tustin
 North Tustin
 Villa Park

Election results from statewide races

List of Assembly Members 
Due to redistricting, the 68th district has been moved around different parts of the state. The current iteration resulted from the 2011 redistricting by the California Citizens Redistricting Commission.

Election results 1992 - present

2020

2018

2016

2014

2012

2010

2008

2006

2004

2002

2000

1998

1996

1994

1992

See also 
 California State Assembly
 California State Assembly districts
 Districts in California

References

External links 
 District map from the California Citizens Redistricting Commission

68
Government in Orange County, California